Hageri is a small borough in Kohila Parish, Rapla County, northern Estonia. As of 2011 census, the settlement's population was 212. Hageri has an area of 105 ha.

People associated with Hageri
Betty Kuuskemaa (1879–1966), actress, born in Hageri
Laine Mesikäpp (1917–2012), actress, singer, folk song collector, born in Hageri
Aleksander Pallas (1887–1939), lawyer and politician, deputy mayor of Tallinn (1918)
Alfred Schmidt (Ain Sillak; 1898–1972), weightlifter, was born in Hageri Manor

References

Boroughs and small boroughs in Estonia
Kohila Parish
Kreis Harrien